Utricularia bifida is a small annual carnivorous plant that belongs to the genus Utricularia. It is native to Asia and Oceania and can be found in Australia, Bangladesh, Burma, Cambodia, China, Guam, India, Indonesia, Japan, Korea, Laos, Malaysia, Nepal, New Guinea, Palau, the Philippines, Sri Lanka, Thailand, and Vietnam. U. bifida grows as a terrestrial plant in damp soils and in rice fields. It was originally described and published by Carl Linnaeus in 1753.

See also 
 List of Utricularia species

References 

bifida
Carnivorous plants of Asia
Carnivorous plants of Australia
Carnivorous plants of the Pacific
Flora of China
Flora of Guam
Flora of tropical Asia
Flora of Japan
Flora of Korea
Flora of Palau
Flora of Queensland
Flora of the Northern Territory
Eudicots of Western Australia
Plants described in 1753
Taxa named by Carl Linnaeus
Flora without expected TNC conservation status